Illegal settlement may refer to:
Illegal construction
Israeli settlement, considered illegal under international law
Squatting